Old MacDonald Had a Farm is an animated musical-comedy short, produced by Famous Studios and released by Paramount Pictures on June 7, 1946.

Plot
Old MacDonald is tired, then goes to the barn, and warms up the farm animals which leads to blackout gags:

The rabbit tries to concentrate on playing his flute, but ends up with the snoring goose swallowing his flute, and causing the rabbit to play flute in a "strangling" manner. The pig plays the stovepipe like a tuba and the lambs sing "Mary Had a Little Lamb", in a fashion like the Andrews Sisters. He blows smoke on the lambs, revealing a blackface gag (edited out in some prints) with the lambs singing "Mary had a little lamb, whose fleece was black as coal!". The duck is annoyed by the goat. In the end, he blows a balloon (using a jar wrap), popping the balloon causing himself to disappear with nothing left but his hat that falls in a bathtub of water. The cat tries to eat the mouse with a violin, but ends up with the mouse playing the harp in his mouth using the cat's whiskers. The horse goes jazzy with the trumpet, and the two chicks do the jitterbug, and after the dance sequence, Old MacDonald asks the audience to sing along with the bouncing ball to "Old MacDonald Had a Farm".

Each animal sung is sung in every verse, and the boys and girls alternate, then the animals form a conga line.

History and availability
This was the second official bouncing ball sing-along in Technicolor released, as well as the second Famous Studios release to revive Max Fleischer's Bouncing Ball concept after the Fleischer Studios' Screen Songs series had ended its run in 1938. The cartoon was backlogged; it was originally supposed to be released in 1945, but production backlogged it to June 7, 1946.

Many copies are NTA prints. However, a French TV station in France had aired a Technicolor version, minus the sing-along sequence, and without the Paramount logo on the head and tail.

A Kodachrome print was once struck from a Technicolor original version, containing all of the original Paramount titles. This version circulates in a minuscule amount of PD tapes, among them United American Video Corp. This supposedly contained a splicey opening and closing.

The uncut original negatives to this film with the front-and-end Paramount titles, like most pre-October 1950 Paramount cartoons in the UM&M/NTA package, is housed at the UCLA Film and Television Archive.

References

External links
A picture from Old Mcdonald Had A Farm Cartoon
Another picture of Old McDonald Had A Farm Cartoon

1946 animated films
1940s American animated films
American musical comedy films
1946 short films
1946 musical comedy films
Paramount Pictures short films
Animated films about animals
American animated short films
1940s English-language films
Films set on farms
Films based on songs
Sing-along